The 55th Homeland Defense Infantry Division is a military formation of the Republic of Korea Army. The division is subordinated to the Ground Operations Command and headquartered in Yongin, Gyeonggi Province. It is in charge of local defense and reserve force training in the southeastern part of Gyeonggi and the Seoul Metropolitan Area. During the wartime, it functions as the regional reserve force in case the main army failed to stop the North Korean invasion through the front line.

History 
It was founded under the name of 63rd Army Training Group in 1975. The unit isginia has a torch on it, which is also the origin of its nickname. At that time, subordinate units were also in Suwon and Pyeongtaek. In 1978, some subordinate units were incorporated into the 99th Brigade (now 51st Division) under the 33rd Infantry Division, which had moved to Hwaseong.

Organization 

Headquarters:
Reconnaissance Battalion
Engineer Battalion
Mobile Battalion
Artillery Battalion
Signal Battalion
Support Battalion
Military Police Battalion
Medical Battalion
Intelligence Company
Chemical Company	
Air Defense Company
Headquarters Company
170th Infantry Brigade
171st Infantry Brigade
172nd Infantry Brigade

References 

InfDiv0055SK
Military units and formations established in 1975
Yongin